Christian Franz Paullini (25 February 1643 – 10 June 1712) was a German physician and theologian.

Biography
Paullini was born in Eisenach to a family of merchants and scholars. His parents wanted him to become a priest and his initial education was designed with this in mind, but Paullini was attracted to the medicinal arts and studied both theology and medicine.

He attended middle school and secondary school in Thuringia and graduated from Coburg.

Paullini studied theology and medicine in Gdańsk, Königsberg, Rostock, Lübeck, Kiel and Copenhagen, was Magister Artium in Wittenberg and received his MD in Leiden. Meanwhile, he accomplished study stays and courses in Cambridge, Oxford, Sweden, Norway and Iceland.Pauliini was the personal physician of the Prince-Bishop of Munster Christoph Bernhard von Galen and later of the Duke of Brunswick in Wolfenbüttel.

Paullini returned to Eisenach in 1685 and 1689 where he assumed the position of "Ducal Stadtphysicus" i.e. city doctor.

He was regarded as a polymath and corresponded with Leibniz and knew the German Jesuit scholar Athanasius Kircher. Paullini was a member of numerous learned societies such as the Fruitbearing Society, Pegnesischer Blumenorden and German Academy of Sciences Leopoldina.

In his long life of approximately 70 years, Paullini wrote 68 books, of which several editions were printed.

Paullini died in 1712 in his home town.

Works

Paullini made extensive reference and resorted to both ancient and contemporary medical authorities and to folk medicine (sailors, farmers, common people). His works reflected a deep learning based on the four temperaments theory and the outcome of a lengthy process of compiling the data obtained from his observation.

Amongst his essential works, there was a textbook on how to use human and animal excrement to cure internal or external diseases, such as fecal bacteriotherapy.

He wrote a treatise on the advantage of the whip for curative purposes in various disorders and a handbook on the toad's therapeutic properties.

As a botanist, he gave his name to Paullinia cupana known as guarana, a climbing plant native to the Amazon basin and especially common in Brazil. As a zoologist, he described the kraken in 1706 after Francesco Negri in Animalia fabulosa.

His commitment to promoting religious freedom was far ahead of his time.

In the same way, Christian Franz Paullini bolstered support for women's education by publishing his works in favor of learned German ladies in 1705 and in 1712. In his book he listed alphabetically all the learned German women known to him.

His poor reputation came 130 years after his death from false historiographies: Rerum et antiquitatum Germanicarum Syntagma, Chronicon Mindense, Chronicon Hüxariense, Carmen de Brunsburgo and Annales Corbeienses.

Bibliography
 
 
 
  on the properties of Sage.
 Coenarum Helena, seu Angvilla 1689 by the University and State Library Düsseldorf
 
 
 
 
 
 
 
 
 "Die heylsame Dreck-Apotheke" 1714 (remastered) by the University and State Library Düsseldorf

References

Further reading

 
 
 
  – 
  (falsification of Paullini)

German theologians
1643 births
1712 deaths
17th-century German physicians
18th-century German physicians
17th-century German writers
17th-century German male writers
18th-century German writers
18th-century German male writers